The 41st International Pokka 1000km was the fifth round of the 2012 Super GT season and the 41st running of the 1000 km Suzuka. It took place on August 19, 2012.

Race results

41st International Pokka 1000km
Suzuka